Salvia leucantha, the Mexican bush sage, is a herbaceous perennial plant that is native to subtropical and tropical conifer forests in central and eastern Mexico. The flowers are usually white, emerging from coloured bracts. It is not frost hardy, but is often grown in warmer latitudes for its prominent arching velvety blue or purple inflorescences.

The linear-lanceolate leaves are a soft mid-green, with whitish, hairy undersides.

Cultivation
This plant has ornamental value in the garden, and has gained the Royal Horticultural Society's Award of Garden Merit. It is a low-maintenance plant that grows best in full sun and moist but well-drained soils. Flowers attract butterflies, bees and hummingbirds.

Etymology
The Latin specific epithet Leucantha means ‘white-flowered’.

Uses
A recent analysis of the essential oil of S. leucantha found it to be rich in the sesquiterpene hydrocarbons ; β-caryophyllene, α-guaiene, cis-muurola-3,5-diene, germacrene D, and bicyclogermacrene. Bornyl acetate constituted 23.9% of the oil.

References

External links
 

leucantha
Flora of Mexico
Taxa named by Antonio José Cavanilles